Tinhosa Grande is an uninhabited islet in São Tomé and Príncipe, located  southwest of the island of Príncipe and  northeast of the island of São Tomé. Together with the smaller islet Tinhosa Pequena, 4 kilometers to its north, it forms the Pedras Tinhosas group.

Since 2012, it forms a part of the UNESCO's Island of Príncipe Biosphere Reserve. A species of skinks found on the islet, Trachylepis adamastor, was first described in 2015.

References

Uninhabited islands of São Tomé and Príncipe
Príncipe
Ramsar sites in São Tomé and Príncipe